The 1929–30 Detroit Cougars season was the fourth season of the Detroit franchise in the National Hockey League (NHL). After qualifying for the playoffs by finishing third in the American Division in 1928–29, the Cougars slipped to fourth to miss the playoffs.

Offseason

Regular season

Final standings

Record vs. opponents

Schedule and results

Playoffs
The Cougars failed to make the playoffs.

Player statistics

Regular season
Scoring

Goaltending

Note: GP = Games played; G = Goals; A = Assists; Pts = Points; PIM = Penalty minutes; PPG = Power-play goals; SHG = Short-handed goals; GWG = Game-winning goals
      MIN = Minutes played; W = Wins; L = Losses; T = Ties; GA = Goals against; GAA = Goals against average; SO = Shutouts;

Awards and records

Transactions

See also
1929–30 NHL season

References

External links

Detroit
Detroit
Detroit Red Wings seasons
Detroit Cougars
Detroit Cougars